This list of botanical gardens and arboretums in Maine is intended to include all significant botanical gardens and arboretums in the U.S. state of Maine

See also
List of botanical gardens and arboretums in the United States

References 

 
Arboreta in Maine
botanical gardens and arboretums in Maine